The Roman Catholic Diocese of Natitingou is a Latin Church diocese of the Catholic Church, located in the city of Natitingou in the Ecclesiastical province of Cotonou in Benin.

History
 February 10, 1964: Established as Diocese of Natitingou from the Apostolic Prefecture of Parakou

Leadership
 Bishops of Natitingou (Latin Church)
 Bishop Patient Redois, S.M.A. (February 10, 1964 – November 11, 1983)
 Bishop Nicolas Okioh (November 11, 1983 – June 10, 1995)
 Bishop Pascal N’Koué (June 28, 1997 – June 14, 2011, elevated to Archbishop of Parakou)
Bishop Antoine Sabi Bio (March 13, 2014–present)

See also
 Roman Catholicism in Benin

References

External links
 GCatholic.org 

Natitingou
Christian organizations established in 1964
Roman Catholic dioceses and prelatures established in the 20th century
Natitingou, Roman Catholic Diocese of